My Body may refer to:
"My Body" (Hadise song)
"My Body" (LSG song)
"My Body" (Paloma Faith song)
"My Body" (Young the Giant song)
"My Body (feat. Mia J.)" (Benny Benassi song)
"My Body", a song by Stephanie Mills from Merciless, 1983
My Body, a 2021 essay collection by Emily Ratajkowski